The Health and Morals of Apprentices Act 1802 (42 Geo III c.73), sometimes known as the Factory Act 1802, was an Act of the Parliament of the United Kingdom designed to improve conditions for apprentices working in cotton mills. The Act was introduced by Sir Robert Peel, who had become concerned in the issue after a 1784 outbreak of a "malignant fever" at one of his cotton mills, which he later blamed on 'gross mismanagement' by his subordinates.

The Act required that cotton mills and factories be properly ventilated and basic requirements on cleanliness be met.  Apprentices in  these premises were to be given a basic education and to attend a religious service at least once a month. They were to be provided with clothing and their working hours were limited to no more than twelve hours a day (excluding meal breaks); they were not to work at night.

The Act was not effectively enforced, and did not address the working conditions of 'free children' (children working in mills who were not apprentices) who rapidly came to heavily outnumber the apprentices.  Regulating the way masters treated their apprentices was a recognised responsibility of Parliament and hence the Act itself was non-contentious, but coming between employer and employee to specify on what terms a man might sell his labour (or that of his child) was highly contentious.  Hence it was not until 1819 that an Act to limit the hours of work (and set a minimum age) for 'free children' working in cotton mills was piloted through Parliament by Peel and his son Robert (the future Prime Minister).  Strictly speaking, it is Peel's Cotton Mills and Factories Act of 1819 which (although also ineffective for want of a means of proper enforcement) paved the way for subsequent Factory Acts that would regulate the industry and set up effective means of regulation; but it is Peel's Act of 1802 which first recognised by legislation the evils of child labour in cotton mills that the Factory Acts addressed.

Background 
During the early Industrial Revolution in the United Kingdom, cotton mills were water-powered, and therefore sprang up where water power was available.  When, as was often the case, there was no ready source of labour in the neighbourhood, the workforce had to be imported.  A cheap and importable source of labour was 'parish apprentices' (pauper children, whose parish was supposed to see them trained to a trade or occupation); mill owners would reach agreement with distant parishes to employ, house and feed their apprentices. In 1800 there were 20,000 apprentices working in cotton mills,. The apprentices were vulnerable to maltreatment by bad masters, to industrial accidents, to ill-health from their work, ill-health from overwork, and ill-health from contagious diseases such as smallpox, typhoid and typhus, which were then widespread. The enclosed conditions (to reduce the frequency of thread breakage, cotton mills were usually very warm and as draught-free as possible) and close contact within mills and factories allowed contagious diseases such as typhus and smallpox to spread rapidly.  Typhoid (like cholera, which did not reach Europe until after the Napoleonic wars) is spread not by poor working conditions but by poor sanitation, but sanitation in mills and the settlements round them often was poor.

In about 1780 a water-powered cotton mill was built for Robert Peel on the River Irwell near Radcliffe; the mill employed child labour bought from workhouses in Birmingham and London. Children were unpaid and bound apprentice until they were 21. They boarded on an upper floor of the building, and were locked in. Shifts were typically 10–10 hours in length (i.e. 12 hours after allowing for meal breaks), and the apprentices 'hot bunked': a child who had just finished his shift would sleep in a bed only just vacated by a child now just starting his shift. Peel himself admitted that conditions at the mill were "very bad".

In 1784 it was brought to the attention of the magistrates of the Salford Hundred that an outbreak of "low, putrid fever, of a contagious nature" had "prevailed many months in the cotton mills and among the poor, in the township of Radcliffe". The doctors of Manchester, led by Dr Thomas Percival were commissioned to investigate the cause of the fever and to recommend how to prevent its spread.  They could not identify the cause, and their recommendations were largely driven by the contemporary view that fevers were spread by putrid atmospheres and hence were to be combatted by removing smells and improving ventilation: 
 Windows and doors should be left open every night and during the lunch break : when the mill was running as many windows as possible were to be left open. (Natural ventilation was poor because there were too few opening lights in the mill windows, and they were all at the same height (too high).
 The stoves currently used for heating did not give much airflow. Chimneys should be built in each work room and turf fires lit in them to give better ventilation and combat contagion by their "strong, penetrating, and pungent" smoke.  
 Rooms should be swept daily and floors washed with lime water once a week. The walls and ceilings should also be whitewashed two or three times a year.
 The apartments should be fumigated weekly with tobacco.
 Privies should be washed daily and ventilated to ensure that the smell did not permeate to the work rooms.
 Rancid oil used to lubricate machinery should be replaced with purer oil.
 To prevent contagion and to preserve health, all employees should be involved in keeping the factory clean. Children should bathe occasionally. The clothes of those infected with fever should be washed in cold water, then in hot and be left to fumigate before being worn again. Those who died of fever should be wrapped promptly in cloth and those in the vicinity advised to smoke tobacco to avoid infection.

The last recommendation expressed a much wider concern about the welfare of mill children:

As a result of this report the magistrates decided not to allow parish apprentices to be indentured to cotton mills where they worked at night or more than ten hours in the day.  Conditions at the Radcliffe mill were improved; in 1795 John Aikin's A Description of the Country from thirty to forty miles round Manchester said of Peel's mills:

Peel introduces his bill
In 1795, the medical men of Manchester (with Percival playing a leading part) formed the Manchester Board of Health, which promptly investigated the employment of children in Manchester factories, taking evidence from (amongst others) Peel now MP for Tamworth.  The board concluded:

Peel (presumably one of the liberal proprietors with excellent regulations who assured his support) introduced his bill in 1802. In doing so Peel said that he was convinced of the existence of gross mismanagement in his own factories, and having no time to set them in order himself, was getting an Act of Parliament passed to do it for him  but (given his dealings with the Manchester Board of Health) this may well have been a pleasantry, rather than the whole truth. In 1816 Peel introduced a further Factory Bill; his explanation to the consequent Select Committee of the need for further legislation included this account of the origins of the 1802 Act:

The Act met little opposition in Parliament, although there was discussion as to whether it should be extended to all manufactories and all workers. The amendment was dismissed as the Act only served to ensure education for apprentices not to improve conditions in factories.

Provisions

Under the Act, regulations and rules came into force on 2 December 1802 and applied to all mills and factories employing three or more apprentices (unless the total workforce was less than twenty). It stated that all mills and factories should be cleaned at least twice yearly with quicklime and water; this included ceilings and walls. There was a requirement that the buildings have sufficient windows and openings for ventilation.

Each apprentice was to be given two sets of clothing, suitable linen, stockings, hats, and shoes, and a new set each year thereafter. Working hours were limited to 12 hours a day, excluding the time taken for breaks. Apprentices were no longer permitted to work during the night (between 9 pm and 6 am). A grace period was provided to allow factories time to adjust, but all night-time working by apprentices was to be discontinued by June 1804.

All apprentices were to be educated in reading, writing and arithmetic for the first four years of their apprenticeship. The Act specified that this should be done every working day within usual working hours but did not state how much time should be set aside for it. Educational classes should be held in a part of the mill or factory designed for the purpose. Every Sunday, for one hour, apprentices were to be taught the Christian religion; every other Sunday, a divine service should be held in the factory, and every month the apprentices should visit a church. They should be prepared for confirmation in the Church of England between the ages of 14 and 18 and must be examined by a clergyman at least once a year. Male and female apprentices were to sleep separately and not more than two per bed.

Local magistrates had to appoint two inspectors known as visitors to ensure that factories and mills were complying with the Act; one was to be a clergyman and the other a Justice of the Peace, neither to have any connection with the mill or factory. The visitors had the power to impose fines for non-compliance and the authority to visit at any time of the day to inspect the premises.

The Act was to be displayed in two places in the factory. Owners who refused to comply with any part of the Act could be fined between £2 and £5.

Effect of the Act 
The Act required magistrates to appoint visitors, whom it empowered to inspect mills and report on their findings, but it did not require them to exercise their powers. Consequently, unless local magistrates were particularly interested in the issue, the Act was poorly enforced. Where factories were inspected, the visitors were amateurs (as indeed they were) in comparison to the paid Factory Inspectorate set up by the 1833 Act. Furthermore, the Act applied only to apprentices, and not to 'free children' whose fathers' right to dispose of their children's labour on whatever terms they chose were unaffected by the Act.  Improvements in the generation of rotary motion by steam engines made steam-powered cotton mills a practical proposition; they were already operating in Manchester in 1795, using free children drawn from the local population.  The great advantage parish apprentices had had was that they were tied to the mill, no matter how remote the mill had to be to avail itself of water power.  If the mill no longer had to be remote, it became a problem that the mill was tied to the apprentices.  Apprentices had to be housed clothed and fed whether or not the mill could sell what they produced; they were in competition with free children whose wages would fall if the mill went on short time (and might not reflect the full cost of housing clothing and feeding them, since that was incurred whether they were working or not) and who could be discharged if sick, injured or otherwise incapable of work.  Consequently, the use of free children came to predominate: the Act became largely a dead letter within its limited scope, and inapplicable to most factory children.

In 1819, when Peel introduced a Bill to introduce an eleven-hour day for all children under 16 working in cotton mills, a Lords Committee heard evidence from a Bolton magistrate who had investigated 29 local cotton mills; 20 had no apprentices but employed a total of 550 children under 14; the other nine mills employed a total of 98 apprentices, and a total of 350 children under 14.  Apprentices were mostly found in the larger mills, which had somewhat better conditions; some even worked a 12-hour day or less (the Grant brothers' mill at Tottington worked an 11.5-hour day: "This establishment has perfect ventilation; all the apprentices, and in fact all the children, are healthy, happy, clean, and well clothed ; proper and daily attention is paid to their instruction ; and they regularly attend divine worship on Sundays."): in other mills children worked up to 15 hours a day in bad conditions (e.g. Gortons and Roberts' Elton mill: "Most filthy; no ventilation; the apprentices and other children ragged, puny, not half clothed, and seemingly not half fed; no instruction of any sort; no human beings can be more wretched").

Although the Act was largely ineffective, it has been seen as the first piece of Health & Safety legislation, leading the way to subsequent regulations covering industrial workplaces; its requirement for factory walls to be whitewashed continued to be a legal requirement until the Factories Act 1961.

Opinions differ as to the deeper significance of the Act. Some scholars have linked the Act to a move away from laissez-faire capitalism, or see it as marking the point where the state began to recognise its responsibility for very poor children, and to address the conditions in which they were living; it has also been seen as presaging subsequent legislation regarding the health of towns.  Others see it as at heart one of the last manifestations of the old Elizabethan Poor Law, which directed that destitute children should be apprenticed in a trade; (more accurately of the Statute of Artificers of 1562 which set up systems for regulating apprenticeships): during Parliamentary debates on the Bill that interpretation was successfully urged against any attempt to widen its applicability.

Notes

References
Footnotes

Bibliography

Further reading

Child labour
History of labour law
Health and safety in the United Kingdom
History of the textile industry in the United Kingdom
Occupational safety and health law
Industrial Revolution in England
United Kingdom Acts of Parliament 1802
Articles containing video clips
United Kingdom labour law